Rock Township is a township in Marshall County, Kansas, United States.

References

Townships in Marshall County, Kansas
Townships in Kansas